Fame, Fortune and Romance is an American television series about the lives of the wealthy and famous, hosted by Robin Leach and Matt Lauer.

It was a spin-off of the television series Lifestyles of the Rich and Famous.

References

External links

1986 American television series debuts
1987 American television series endings
First-run syndicated television programs in the United States
Infotainment
Television series created by Al Masini